Martin Adeline (born 2 December 2003) is a French professional footballer who plays as a midfielder for  club Rodez on loan from Reims.

Club career
A youth product of Rodez, Épernay, and Paris Saint-Germain, Adeline joined the reserves of Reims in 2020. He signed his first professional contract with the club on 16 December 2021. His professional debut with Reims came in a 1–1 Ligue 1 tie with Marseille on 22 December 2021.

On 31 January 2023, Adeline returned to his childhood club Rodez in Ligue 2 on loan until the end of the 2022–23 season.

International career
Adeline is a youth international for France. He represented the France U19s in November 2021.

References

External links
 
 FFF Profile
 

2003 births
Sportspeople from Marne (department)
Footballers from Grand Est
Living people
People from Épernay
French footballers
France youth international footballers
Association football midfielders
Rodez AF players
RC Épernay Champagne players
Paris Saint-Germain F.C. players
Stade de Reims players
Ligue 1 players
Championnat National 2 players